Iraq on the Record: The Bush Administration's Public Statements on Iraq was a report by Henry Waxman.

Excerpt from the release of the report by Henry Waxman.

On March 19, 2003, U.S. forces began military operations in Iraq. Addressing the nation about the purpose of the war on the day the bombing began, President Bush stated: “The people of the United States and our friends and allies will not live at the mercy of an outlaw regime that threatens the peace with weapons of mass murder.”

One year later, many doubts have been raised regarding the Administration’s assertions about the threat posed by Iraq. Prior to the war in Iraq, the President and his advisors repeatedly claimed that Iraq possessed weapons of mass destruction that jeopardized the security of the United States. The failure to discover these weapons after the war has led to questions about whether the President and his advisors were candid in describing Iraq’s threat.

Summary of Report 
This report contains 237 claims for specific misleading statements made by:

Colin Powell
Donald Rumsfeld
Condoleezza Rice
George W. Bush
Dick Cheney

The report claims that great care was taken to ensure the accuracy, objectiveness and also fairness to the parties involved. However, its content does not include specific reasons for the statements given nor any possible defense or justification in favor of the individuals in question.

The information contained in this report has been prepared by all public
statements, hearings and conferences. The official website for this report also contains every statement's source, to ensure that public review is possible.

The report along with the searchable database compiled by the Special Investigations Division are accessible via the web by Congress and the General Public.

External links
http://permanent.access.gpo.gov/lps60698/pdf_admin_iraq_on_the_record_rep.pdf
https://web.archive.org/web/20050825104423/http://democrats.reform.house.gov/IraqOnTheRecord/pdf_admin_iraq_on_the_record_rep.pdf
https://web.archive.org/web/20050825103347/http://democrats.reform.house.gov/IraqOnTheRecord/

Reports of the United States government